Michael Hook (born 14 December 1982) is a rugby union skills coach and Head coach at the Ospreys and Welsh Premiership team the Bridgend Ravens Respectfully. Hook played the position of fly-half. Brother of Wales international James Hook he has represented Wales U16S up to U21s playing in two U21 world cups as well as being a part of the Grand Slam winning U21s team in 2003.

As a coach Mike led the resurgence of Pontypool RFC in 2012 and Was head coach at Bridgend Ravens for their Swalec cup title win in 2015.
Mike grew up playing rugby in the Southern Welsh industrial town of Port Talbot, playing for such clubs as Aberavon RFC before turning pro at senior level with Newport RFC.
He moved as a professional from Newport to Bristol Shoguns in 2003 where he suffered a shoulder injury that kept him out of the game for over a year. He made a comeback which included a season with Rugby league side the Celtic Crusaders. He played the 2006–2007 season for Cornish side Redruth in the English National Division where he broke their all-time points record. In a Rugby World article he commented that he still has ambitions to play for the Welsh full side. During the 2007–08 season Hook played firstly in National Division 1 with Pertemps Bees before signing for Newport RFC in the Welsh Premiership. Cont...

He is mentioned in Gavin Henson's autobiography as one of the players that beat him to a place for the Wales Fira Team.
Mike took up coaching after retiring from the game due to a serious neck injury. Roles which include to date, Defence and Head coach at Pontypool RFC. Backs and Head coach at Bridgend Ravens and Skills Coach of the Regional side the Ospreys.

Notes

1982 births
Living people
Aberavon RFC players
Birmingham & Solihull R.F.C. players
Crusaders Rugby League players
Llanelli RFC players
Newport RFC players
Pontypool RFC players
Rugby league players from Port Talbot
Rugby union players from Port Talbot
Rugby union fly-halves
Welsh rugby league players
Welsh rugby union coaches
Welsh rugby union players